Ariadne (also known as 4C-D, 4C-DOM, α-Et-2C-D, BL-3912, or dimoxamine) is a little-known psychoactive drug. It is a homologue of the psychedelics 2C-D and DOM. Ariadne was first synthesized by Alexander Shulgin. In his book PiHKAL, Shulgin reported testing Ariadne up to a dose of 32 mg, and reported that it produced "the alert of a psychedelic, with none of the rest of the package". Very little published data exists about the human pharmacology of Ariadne apart from Shulgin's limited testing; unpublished human trials reportedly observed some psychoactive effects, but no hallucinations.

Shulgin reported that the drug was tested by Bristol Laboratories as an antidepressant, in an anecdote where he was explaining how human testing is invaluable (compared to animal testing) on drugs that change the state of the mind.  He said, "Before they launched into a full multi-clinic study to determine if it's going to be worth the animal studies or not, every person on the board of directors took it."

In animal studies, Ariadne was shown to produce stimulus generalization in rats trained to respond to MDMA or LSD.

See also 
 4C-B
 4C-T-2
 Phenethylamine
 Psychedelics, dissociatives and deliriants

References

Substituted amphetamines
Entactogens and empathogens
2,5-Dimethoxyphenethylamines
Serotonin-norepinephrine-dopamine releasing agents